Kivi Zhimomi is an Indian professional footballer who plays as a forward for I-League club Gokulam Kerala FC in Kerala Premier League.

Career
In 2017, he became the first Naga player to play in I-League. In 2018, he became the first Naga player to play in Indian Super League.

Gokulam Kerala FC
He joined back his first professional club Gokulam Kerala in 2021 to play Kerala Premier League.

Career statistics

Club

References

Living people
Indian footballers
Footballers from Nagaland
Association football forwards
I-League players
Indian Super League players
NorthEast United FC players
I-League 2nd Division players
1996 births